State Your Case was an Australian television program which aired from May to July 1957 on Sydney station ATN-7.

Hosted by Eric Baume, the program aired live on Sundays. Baume would have a discussion with a different person in each episode. Former New South Wales Premier Jack Lang appeared as the guest on the 19 May 1957 episode.

Baume also had another program on ATN, titled This I Believe, which debuted 3 December 1956, and which out-lived State Your Case. From 1959 to 1961 he hosted Eric Baume's Viewpoint.

References

External links

1957 Australian television series debuts
1957 Australian television series endings
Australian television talk shows
Black-and-white Australian television shows
English-language television shows
Australian live television series
Seven Network original programming